The speed limits in Zimbabwe are as follows:

Fines are charged for excess speed of 6 – 49 km/h above the applicable limit and speeding at 50 km/h or more above the applicable limit results in a court appearance.

The categorisation wide tar refers to asphalt concrete-surfaced roads with at least two lanes (one lane in each direction).

References

Zimbabwe
Road transport in Zimbabwe